Los Hombres Calientes is the self-titled debut album by the New Orleans-based Afro-Cuban jazz group, co-led by trumpeter Irvin Mayfield and percussionist Bill Summers. Though no longer performing with the group, drummer Jason Marsalis of the Marsalis family appears on this album.

Track listing 
Victor el Rojo 6:44  
El Barrio 3:56  
Bill's Q Yvette 3:31  
Stardust 5:27  
Rhumba Para Jason 6:04  
After You're Gone 3:00  
Pulphus Final Frontier 4:31  
Ye Ye O 5:01  
Rompe Saraguey 6:07  
Irvin's Crisis 5:01

Personnel
Irvin Mayfield – trumpeter, bandleader
Bill Summers – percussionist, bandleader
David Pulphus – bassist
Yvette-Bostic Summers – percussionist, vocalist
Jason Marsalis – drummer
Victor Atkins III – pianist

1998 albums
Los Hombres Calientes albums